The Crash at Crush was a one-day publicity stunt in the U.S. state of Texas that took place on September 15, 1896, in which two uncrewed locomotives were crashed into each other head-on at high speed. William George Crush, general passenger agent of the Missouri–Kansas–Texas Railroad, conceived the idea in order to demonstrate a staged train wreck as a public spectacle.

As a result, an estimated 40,000 people—more people than lived in the state's second-largest city at the time—attended the event. Unexpectedly, the impact caused both engine boilers to explode, resulting in a shower of flying debris that killed three people and caused numerous injuries among the spectators.

Preparations
The Missouri–Kansas–Texas Railroad (popularly known as the "Katy", from its "M-K-T" initials) had first reached the Crush area in the 1880s, during the construction of a route between Dallas and Houston. As the railroad expanded, the Katy replaced its 30-ton steam engines with newer, more powerful 60-ton engines, and subsequently a stockpile of the older units, for which the railroad now had no use, began to accumulate.

A locomotive crash staged by the Columbus and Hocking Valley Railroad at Buckeye Park near Lancaster, Ohio on May 30, 1896 had been a huge success. Buckeye Park was established and owned by the railroad to entice residents of nearby Columbus to take weekend excursions. The locomotive crash was planned for the park's annual opening day and drew approximately 20,000 spectators. While no admission was charged, money was made on the railroad passenger traffic to and from the park. 

Crush imagined a similar spectacle for which Katy could advertise to thousands of potential passengers. Crush's superiors agreed to his proposal and put him in charge of the project. As with the crash at Buckeye Park, the event would be free of charge, instead profiting from the sale of tickets on special excursion trains that would run to and from the site.

Two water wells were drilled at the site and a circus tent from Ringling Brothers was erected, as well as a grandstand, three speakers' stands, a platform for reporters, two telegraph offices, and a special train depot, over which a giant sign proclaimed the new town as "Crush, Texas". Events from the Midway Plaisance, including lemonade stands, carnival games, medicine shows, cigar vendors and other sideshows were highly anticipated, with a construction foreman saying that "This feature alone will be worth going to Crush to see." A separate four-mile segment of track was built for the event alongside the Katy railroad so that there was no chance a runaway train could end up on the main line; each end of the track was situated atop a low hill on opposite sides of a bowl-shaped valley in which the trains would meet. The locomotives to be used were two  decommissioned Baldwin engines, No. 999 and No. 1001.

Safety precautions
On the day before the exhibition, railroad officials staged a speed test of the engines to help predict the precise point of collision. Katy engineers assured Crush that his grand idea was safe, specifically that the boilers on the steam engines had been designed to resist ruptures and that, even in a very high-speed crash, they were unlikely to explode. Each engine would pull six boxcars behind it; because the couplers used to link the cars were considered unreliable, the cars were chained together to prevent them from coming apart during the impact.

Katy officials expected a crowd of between 20,000 and 25,000 people to attend, but the clever marketing ploy was an overwhelming success and the railroad sold out more than 30 special excursion trains to the event.

Crash

The crash was delayed for an hour because the crowd resisted being pressed back by the police to what was supposedly a safe distance. At about 5 pm, the two trains, pulling cars loaded with railroad ties, slowly met in the middle of the track to be photographed. They were then rolled to their starting points at the opposite ends of the track. Crush, riding a white charger, signaled the start of the main event. The engineers and crew aboard each train opened the steam to a prearranged setting, rode for exactly four turns of the driving wheels, and then jumped from the trains. The September 16 issue of The Dallas Morning News described what happened next:

Shortly after the trains collided, there was a large explosion:

Debris was blown hundreds of feet into the air. Panic quickly broke out as the crowd turned and ran. Some of the debris came down among the spectators, killing two and seriously injuring at least six others. A photographer, Jarvis "Joe" Deane of Waco, lost one eye to a flying bolt. The locomotives and their boxcars were reduced to scraps of wood and steel:

Aftermath
The story made national headlines, and Crush was immediately fired from the Katy Railroad. In light of a lack of negative publicity, however, he was rehired the next day and continued to work for the company until his retirement, in a career spanning six decades. Though the incident had resulted in tragedy, the Katy benefited enormously from the attention it received, including international recognition. Despite the disaster, many railroads continued to stage locomotive collisions in the following years.

Ragtime composer Scott Joplin, who was performing in the region at the time, composed a piano piece he called the "Great Crush Collision March" to commemorate the crash; the composition was dedicated to the Missouri-Kansas-Texas Railway. It was copyrighted on October 15, 1896, a month after the event. The piece was notable because it included instructions in the score for how to replicate the sounds of the trains' collision through playing techniques, specific notes, and the use of dynamics.

In 1976, the Texas Historical Commission erected a historical marker (number 5315) a few miles from the site in West, Texas.

See also
 Boiler explosion
 List of train songs

References

Further reading
 
 Ward, George B. The Crash at Crush: Texas' Great Pre-arranged Train Wreck. M.A. thesis, University of Texas at Austin, May 1975.
 
 
 
 Swartz, Clay. "The Crash at Crush". Cowboys & Indians. p. 114–118. August/September 2014.
 Braswell, Sean. "Staging a Texas-Size Train Disaster." Ozy. Staging a Texas-Size Train Disaster for Fun and Profit
 Cox, Mike (2019). "Train Crash at Crush, Texas: America's Deadliest Publicity Stunt (Disaster)". The History Press.

Railway accidents in 1896
1896 in Texas
Railway accidents and incidents in Texas
History of Texas
Geography of McLennan County, Texas
Missouri–Kansas–Texas Railroad
Songs about Texas
Publicity stunts